The Former Tait & Co. Merchant House is a historical building in Anping District, Tainan, Taiwan.

History
After the signing of Treaty of Tientsin for Qing Dynasty in June 1858 in Tientsin, Anping was one of the harbor in Taiwan which was opened for international trade. Trading company Tait & Company constructed the building in 1867 as their merchant house. During the Japanese rule, the building housed a salt company. After the handover of Taiwan from Japan to the Republic of China in 1945, the building became the office of Tainan Salt Works. In 1979, the building was transformed into a museum with the upper floor became the Taiwan Development Wax Museum. It was designated as class 3 historical building.

Architecture
The two-story building was designed with western colonial style with white paint color. The ground floor was the workers dormitory with a center pathway and three rooms on each side. The upper floor has its arcade railing decorated with green glaze vase type of decoration. It also features a warehouse next to it which now has been turned into the Anping Tree House.

Exhibitions

The building displays the history of immigrants in Taiwan on the ground floor and also wax sculptures of humans, animals and artifacts on the upper floor.

Transportation
The building is accessible by bus from Tainan Station of Taiwan Railways.

See also
 List of tourist attractions in Taiwan

References

1867 establishments in Taiwan
Houses completed in 1867
Houses in Taiwan
Museums in Tainan
Wax museums